Rampling is a surname. Notable people with the surname include:

Anne Rampling, a pseudonym used by writer Anne Rice
Charlotte Rampling, OBE (born 1946), British-French actress (daughter of Godfrey)
Clark Rampling (1793–1875), English architect
Danny Rampling, British House Music DJ
Eddie Rampling, English footballer
Godfrey Rampling (1909–2009), English athlete and army officer (father of Charlotte)
Isabelle Rampling (born 1985), Canadian synchronized swimmer
Tony Rampling, former professional rugby league footballer in the New South Wales Rugby League

fr:Rampling